Proteomics is a peer-reviewed scientific journal covering topics including whole proteome analysis of organisms, protein expression profiling, disease, pharmaceutical, agricultural and biotechnological applications, and analysis of cellular systems, organelles and protein complexes.
It is published by Wiley VCH and the current editor-in-chief is Lucie Kalvodova.

According to the Journal Citation Reports, the journal has a 2020 impact factor of 3.984, ranking it 23rd out of 78 journals in the category "Biochemical Research Methods".

References

Publications established in 2006
English-language journals
Bimonthly journals
Proteomics journals
Wiley (publisher) academic journals